Michał Adam Miśkiewicz (born 20 January 1989) is a Polish professional footballer who plays as a goalkeeper for Wieczysta Kraków.

Club career
Born in Kraków, Miśkiewicz joined Italian Serie A club Milan from Polish Kmita Zabierzów at the beginning of the 2007–08 season. He spent two season in the club's youth system and was a member of the under-19 side who won the Campionato Berretti final in 2009, as well as playing some games for the under-20 side.

In July 2009, Miśkiewicz was sent out on loan to Chievo, but he went on to make no appearances for the first team throughout the season and instead played mainly for the youth team.

At the beginning of the 2010–11 season, Miśkiewicz was loaned out again, this time to Seconda Divisione club Crociati Noceto. He made his official debut for the club on 18 August 2010, in the second game of the Coppa Italia Lega Pro group stage against Carpi, which Crociati Noceto lost 1–0. Serving mainly as Luca Babbini's understudy, his league debut came only on 27 March 2011, in a 1–0 home loss against L'Aquila.

On June 19, 2012, he signed a two-year contract with Ekstraklasa club Wisła Kraków.

On 13 September 2019, Miśkiewicz joined Polish club Wieczysta Kraków.

International career
Miśkiewicz made one appearance for the Poland national under-19 football team which came in a 3–1 win over Russia in August 2007.

Statistics

Honours

Milan
Campionato Berretti: 2008–09

References

External links
 Squad list at official club website 
 Profile at Assocalciatori.it 
 Profile at emozionecalcio.it 
 

1989 births
Living people
Footballers from Kraków
Association football goalkeepers
Polish footballers
Poland international footballers
Polish expatriate footballers
Serie C players
Ekstraklasa players
Primeira Liga players
A.C. Milan players
A.C. ChievoVerona players
F.C. Südtirol players
Wisła Kraków players
C.D. Feirense players
Korona Kielce players
Wieczysta Kraków players
Polish expatriate sportspeople in Italy
Polish expatriate sportspeople in Portugal
Expatriate footballers in Italy
Expatriate footballers in Portugal